Delisle is an unincorporated community in Darke County, in the U.S. state of Ohio.

History
Delisle was platted by Catherine Fairchild in 1850 when the railroad was extended to that point. A post office was established at Delisle in 1856, and remained in operation until 1993.

References

Unincorporated communities in Darke County, Ohio
Unincorporated communities in Ohio